Bold is a surname. Notable people with the name include:

 Alan Bold (Scottish writer)
 Gary Bold (New Zealand physicist)
 Gina Bold (English artist)
 Aaron Bold (Lacrosse player)
 Samuel Bold (English clergyman)
 Charlie Bold (Major League Baseball player)
 William Bold (Australian town clerk)

See also
 List of people known as the Bold
 Bold (disambiguation)